Constantin Schreiber (born 14 June 1979, in Cuxhaven) is a German journalist working for German and Arabic language TV stations.

Life 
As a teenager, Schreiber learned Arabic while spending time in Syria. He holds a law degree and worked as a journalist for the Lebanese newspaper Daily Star from 2006 to 2007. After that, he was a news correspondent for Deutsche Welle in Dubai and accompanied German Chancellor Angela Merkel on her first trip through the Middle East. From 2009 to 2011, Schreiber served as a media consultant for the Middle East at the German Federal Foreign Ministry.

Since 2012, Schreiber has worked as a host and Middle East expert for the German TV channel n-tv.  In addition, he also hosts the German-Arabic TV series SciTech - Our World Tomorrow which is aired on ONTV (Egypt) and Sultanate of Oman Television.

In January 2017, Schreiber switched to ARD aktuell, where he hosted the early and weekend editions of the Tagesschau, as well as the Nachtmagazin. Since March 2017, Schreiber has also hosted the NDR program Zapp – Das Medienmagazin as the successor of Inka Schneider.

In 2017, his book Inside Islam – What's Preached in Germany's Mosques appeared in the Econ Verlag as well as the TV series the moscheereport on tagesschau24. For the research of these two works, Schreiber and a camera crew visited almost 20 ordinary mosques in Germany and translated their Khutbah. The research was harshly criticized.

He lives in Hamburg with his wife and children.

Writing
Schreiber is the author of:
 Ausverkauf Deutschland. Wie ausländische Investoren unser Land übernehmen., Econ Verlag, Berlin, 2010. .
 1000 Peitschenhiebe. Weil ich sage, was ich denke. Ullstein Buchverlag, 2015. .
 Marhaba, Flüchtling! Im Dialog mit arabischen Flüchtlingen. Hoffmann und Campe, Hamburg 2016. .
 Inside Islam. Was in Deutschlands Moscheen gepredigt wird. Econ Verlag, Berlin, 2017. .
 Kinder des Koran. Was muslimische Schüler lernen. Econ Verlag, Berlin, 2019, .
 Die Kandidatin. Hoffmann und Campe, Hamburg, 2021, .

References

External links

1979 births
German television journalists
German male journalists
21st-century German journalists
German non-fiction writers
German critics of Islam
Living people
German male writers
ARD (broadcaster) people
Tagesschau (ARD) presenters and reporters